Samuel Mráz (born 13 May 1997) is a Slovak professional footballer who plays as a forward for Cypriot First Division club Anorthosis, on loan from  club Spezia. He also represents the Slovakia national team.

Club career

Senica
Mráz started his football career at hometown club ŠK Malacky, before first moving to TJ Záhoran Kostolište and later to the youth academy of Senica. In July 2013, Scottish club Celtic showed their interest in him, but in the end he chose to stay in Senica. In February 2014, he won a poll for Best Athlete in the City of Senica in 2013 in the collective category of under-17s.

Mráz made his professional debut for Senica against AS Trenčín on 12 April 2014 as a starter, before being substituted in the 62nd minute. That year, he was in the starting lineup eight times under head coach Pavel Hapal. On 30 June 2014, he signed a new contract with the team until the end of the 2016–17 season. He scored his first goal for Senica that season in a league match 28 November 2014; a regional derby against Spartak Trnava, which ended in a 1–1 draw. On 25 February 2015, was awarded Best Athlete in the City of 2014 in the under-19 collective category. He made 15 appearances that year.

Empoli
On 19 July 2018, Mráz joined newly promoted Serie A team Empoli. Empoli's coach Aurelio Andreazzoli fielded Mráz for his first league fixture on 26 August 2018, against Genoa in a 2-1 defeat. Mráz came on in 77th minute for Antonino La Gumina. He also became the first Slovak to score in his Serie A debut, when he scored against Federico Marchetti in the 94th minute, after a cross from Giovanni Di Lorenzo.

On 30 September 2018, he was selected in the starting XI of a game in Italy for the first time. He played 60 minutes of the game against Parma, which Empoli lost 0-1.

Loan to Crotone
On 30 January 2019, Mráz joined Serie B club Crotone on loan until 30 June 2019. On 10 February, he made his debut in a home match against Verona while scoring his first goal for I Rossoblu two weeks later in a 3–0 home win over Palermo.

Loan to Brøndby
In August 2019, Mráz moved to Danish Superliga club Brøndby IF on a one-season loan while his new club secured an option to sign him on a permanent basis.
On 1 September 2019, he made his Superliga debut for Brøndby as a substitute in a 0–1 loss against FC Midtjylland. Mostly a substitute through the fall of the 2019–20 season, Mráz made two subsequent starts during regular forward Kamil Wilczek's two-match suspension. In the second fixture, a league match against Esbjerg fB, Mráz scored a brace to secure a 2–1 home win and thereby helped consolidate Brøndby's third position in the league table. 

After Wilczek left in January 2020, Mráz made more appearances and scored his first goal of the new decade on 23 January in a 2–3 loss to AaB. On 30 June 2020, Mráz and teammate Simon Hedlund tested positive for SARS-CoV-2 during the COVID-19 pandemic, ruling them out for at least a week. He left the club at the end of the season with 23 appearances and five goals to his name, as his loan deal expired.

Loan to Zagłębie Lubin
On 13 August 2020, Mráz joined Polish Ekstraklasa club Zagłębie Lubin on a season-long loan with an option to buy. He made his debut as a starter on 21 August in 2–1 home win over Lech Poznań, before being substituted in the 67th minute for Rok Sirk. On 7 December, he scored his first goal for the club in a 1–1 home draw against Piast Gliwice.

Spezia
On 9 August 2021, after his loan with Zagłębie Lubin ended, Mráz moved to Serie A club Spezia on a permanent deal, signing a three-year contract. He made his debut on 13 August in a Coppa Italia match against Pordenone. On 23 August, he made his first league appearance for the club as a substitute in the 69th minute for Emmanuel Gyasi in a 2–2 draw against Cagliari.

Loan to Slovan Bratislava
On 2 September 2021, Slovan announced the signing of Mráz on a one-year loan with a subsequent option for a permanent transfer. The move occurred less than a month after his signing with Spezia. Slovan had signed him to increase the internal competition ahead of Europa Conference League group stage as well as domestic duties and to allow Mráz to regain the form, which earned his initial transfer to Serie A.

Loan to Mirandés
On 1 September 2022, Mráz moved on a season-long loan to Mirandés in Spain. He made his debut for the club two days later, replacing Roberto López in the 81st minute of a 3–0 league loss to Villarreal B. The loan was terminated early on 24 January 2023.

Loan to Anorthosis Famagusta
On 24 January 2023, Mráz moved onto another loan, this time to Cypriot First Division club Anorthosis Famagusta.

International career
Mráz has played for every national team youth team from the U15 team through the U21 team.

Mráz was first called up to Slovakia's senior national team on 2 October 2018 by the coach Ján Kozák for matches against Czech Republic (a part of 2018–19 UEFA Nations League) and a friendly against Sweden later in October. However, Mráz was also an alternate for friendly games against  the Netherlands, Morocco, Denmark and Slovakia's first UEFA Nations League match against Ukraine. Nonetheless Kozák faced questions from the press and criticism from the fans on social media for not calling Mráz up earlier in the year, especially for May/June fixture, as Mráz became the top scorer in the finishing Fortuna Liga season.

Mráz, however, did not debut under Kozák. Slovakia's most successful coach resigned on 14 October 2018 after a 1-2 derby match loss to Czech Republic. Nonetheless, he debuted on 16 October 2018 in a 1–1 draw in Solna against Sweden, in a game managed by caretaker manager Štefan Tarkovič, coming on as a substitute for Adam Nemec in the 71st minute.

Career statistics

Club

International goals
Scores and results list Slovakia's goal tally first.

Honours
Slovan Bratislava
 Fortuna Liga: 2021–22

Individual
 Fortuna Liga Player of the Year: 2017–18
 Fortuna Liga top scorer: 2017–18

References

External links
 
 FK Senica profile
 Eurofotbal profile

1997 births
Sportspeople from Malacky
Living people
Slovak footballers
Slovakia international footballers
Slovakia under-21 international footballers
Slovakia youth international footballers
Slovak expatriate footballers
Association football forwards
FK Senica players
MŠK Žilina players
Empoli F.C. players
F.C. Crotone players
Brøndby IF players
Zagłębie Lubin players
Spezia Calcio players
ŠK Slovan Bratislava players
CD Mirandés footballers
Anorthosis Famagusta F.C. players
Slovak Super Liga players
Serie A players
Serie B players
Danish Superliga players
Ekstraklasa players
Segunda División players
Cypriot First Division players
Expatriate footballers in Italy
Expatriate men's footballers in Denmark
Expatriate footballers in Poland
Expatriate footballers in Spain
Expatriate footballers in Cyprus
Slovak expatriate sportspeople in Italy
Slovak expatriate sportspeople in Denmark
Slovak expatriate sportspeople in Poland
Slovak expatriate sportspeople in Spain
Slovak expatriate sportspeople in Cyprus